The 2012–13 VfR Aalen season was the 92nd season in the club's football history. The club competed in the 2. Bundesliga, the second tier of German football. It was the club's first-ever season in this league, having won promotion from the 3. Liga in 2011–12.

The club also took part in the DFB-Pokal, the German Cup, where it reached the second round, losing 4–1 to Bundesliga side Borussia Dortmund.

Pre-season

Competitions

2. Bundesliga

League table

Results summary

Results by matchday

Matches

DFB-Pokal

Sources

External links
 2012–13 VfR Aalen season at Weltfussball.de 
 2012–13 VfR Aalen season at kicker.de 
 2012–13 VfR Aalen season at Fussballdaten.de 

Aalen
VfR Aalen seasons